Earl D. Bloom (May 29, 1871 – June 8, 1930) was an American politician who served as the 35th, 37th and 39th lieutenant governor of Ohio from 1917 to 1919, 1923 to 1925, and 1927 to 1928.

Bloom ran for governor in 1928 but lost in the Democratic primary.  He was a lawyer and a banker.

Biography

Earl Bloom was born in Wood County, Ohio May 29, 1871 to James L. and Lydia A. (Ackerman) Bloom. He attended public schools of Wood County, and from 1889 to 1895 Ohio Northern University College of Law, where he received an LL.B.

In 1895, Bloom was admitted to the bar and was married to Eleanor G. Lathrop July 24. They had one child, Alice G. Bloom. Bloom practiced law in Bloomdale, Ohio, before moving to Bowling Green, Ohio in 1905.

During World War I, Bloom was director of the Red Cross in Wood County. He was a member of F. & A.M., R. A. M., Knights Templar, Scottish Rite, 32nd Degree, Independent Order of Odd Fellows, B.P.O.E., and the Wood County Bar Association.

Bloom died in Toledo, and is buried in Old Maplewood Cemetery, North Baltimore, Ohio.

References

Sources
Political Graveyard entry on Bloom

1871 births
Lieutenant Governors of Ohio
People from Bowling Green, Ohio
Ohio lawyers
Ohio Democrats
Claude W. Pettit College of Law alumni
1930 deaths
People from Wood County, Ohio